Lucille Lisle (1908–2004) was an Australian actress. Born Lucille Hunter Jonas in Melbourne, Australia on 16 May 1908, she began appearing in local stage productions at age 11. In 1930 she moved to New York where she appeared in touring companies.  In 1932 moved to Britain and had her greatest success in the West End. In 1942, she married Lieutenant Nicholas Harris, a Royal Navy officer.  She then limited her work to radio drama before retiring in 1958. She died in Kent, England on 23 September 2004.

Selected filmography
 After Dark (1932)
 Expert's Opinion (1935)
 Twice Branded (1936)
 Midnight at Madame Tussaud's (1936)
 The Minstrel Boy (1937)
 Special Edition (1938)

Radio 

 The Dark Tower (1946)

References

External links
 

Australian film actresses
1908 births
2004 deaths
Actresses from Melbourne